Ennodius murrayi is a species of leaf beetle of Guinea, Ivory Coast, Nigeria, Cameroon, Equatorial Guinea (including Bioko), the Republic of the Congo and the Democratic Republic of the Congo, described by Félicien Chapuis in 1874.

References 

Eumolpinae
Beetles of Africa
Insects of West Africa
Insects of Cameroon
Insects of Equatorial Guinea
Fauna of Bioko
Insects of the Republic of the Congo
Beetles of the Democratic Republic of the Congo
Taxa named by Félicien Chapuis
Beetles described in 1874